Roswell Beebe (1795 – September 27, 1856) was an American politician, business executive, and real estate purveyor during the early 19th century. Serving as president of the Cairo and Fulton Railroad, Roswell Beebe was an important figure in the early development of Little Rock, Arkansas, where he was elected alderman (1848) and mayor of the city (1849).  On September 25, 1839, he received the original patent for the town of Little Rock, signed by President Martin Van Buren.

Beebe, Arkansas (and later, its current city hall) was also named after Roswell Beebe.

"As first President of the Cairo and Fulton Railroad company, Roswell Beebe guided the southern portion of the Union Pacific (which is now named the Southern Pacific line) from Tennessee to Little Rock and then on to San Antonio, Texas". The Roswell Beebe train ran on this track and was named after its benefactor.

Beebe was born in New York City to a wealthy English family, and he died there while visiting in 1856.  His body was returned to Little Rock, where it was buried in Mount Holly Cemetery, one of the city cemeteries that he had donated.

References

Bibliography
 Atkinson, J. H., ed. "Letters from Solon Borland to Roswell Beebe." Arkansas Historical Quarterly 18 (Autumn 1959): 287–290.
 "Roswell Beebe Materials, 1795–1925." Butler Center for Arkansas Studies. Central Arkansas Library System, Little Rock, Arkansas.

1795 births
1856 deaths
19th-century American politicians
Burials at Mount Holly Cemetery
Businesspeople from Arkansas
Mayors of Little Rock, Arkansas
19th-century American businesspeople